Samlandic was a Low Prussian dialect of Low German. It was divided into Ostsamländisch and Westsamländisch. Both were from East Prussia.

Geography 
Westsamländisch was spoken West of Königsberg. Westsamländisch had a border with Ostsamländisch.

Ostsamländisch was spoken around Königsberg, Labiau and Wehlau. Ostsamländisch had a border with Natangian, Westsamländisch and Eastern Low Prussian.

Samlandic was spoken around Neukuhren and Heydekrug.

Phonology 
Westsamländisch has, in contrast to the remainder of Samlandic, for (I) go, (I) stand etc. jon, schton etc. O before R is spoken with a long vowel. It has ick sint meaning I am and tije for ten. Westsamländisch has long u as long ü. A is palatal. It has  for High German durch, English through.

History 
During the latter age of the Teutonic order, Latvian-Curonian fishermen came to nowadays Pionerski, Primorye, and Filino.

Culture 
Anke van Tharaw is a poem written in Samlandic.

Bibliography 
 Wanda Nimtz-Wendlandt:  Die Nehringer, Elwert, 1986. .

References 

East Prussia
Low Prussian dialect
Languages of Russia